A. melanoleuca may refer to:

 Ailuropoda melanoleuca, the giant panda, a critically endangered mammal species found in China
 Amblystoma melanoleuca, a terrestrial salamander species

See also
 Melanoleuca (disambiguation)